The 1987 NCAA Division I Wrestling Championships were the 57th NCAA Division I Wrestling Championships to be held. The University of Maryland in College Park, Maryland hosted the tournament at Cole Field House.

Iowa State took home the team championship with 133 points and four individual champions. 

John Smith of Oklahoma State was named the Most Outstanding Wrestler and Lenny Bernstein of North Carolina received the Gorriaran Award.

Team results

Individual finals

References
1987 NCAA Tournament Results

NCAA Division I Wrestling Championship
NCAA
Wrestling competitions in the United States
NCAA Division I  Wrestling Championships
NCAA Division I  Wrestling Championships
NCAA Division I  Wrestling Championships